Videosex was a Yugoslav synth-pop band formed in Ljubljana in 1982.

The band was established in 1982, but the steady lineup was formed in 1983, consisting of Anja Rupel (vocals), Janez Križaj (bass guitar), Iztok Turk (drums), Matjaž Kosi (keyboards) and Nina Sever (keyboards). The band soon gained attention from the Yugoslav public, and their debut album, Videosex '84, brought them nationwide popularity. During the following years, the band had a number of mainstream hits, often with elements of jazz, maintaining at the same time artistic direction in their work. The group ended their activity in 1992, Rupel continuing her career as a solo artist.

History

1982–1992
The group was formed in 1982, but did not have a steady lineup until 1983, when keyboardist Matjaž Kosi, formerly of Martin Krpan, drummer Iztok Turk, formerly of Kuzle and Otroci Socializma (in the latter band he played guitar), and bass guitarist Janez Križaj, formerly of Otroci Socializma, invited keyboardist Nina Sever and vocalist Anja Rupel to join the group. Rupel, daughter of schlager singer Sonja Berce, was at the time of Videosex formation a high school student and, beside singing in children's choirs and learning to play flute in a music school, had no previous experience as a performer. The band was named Videosex after the idea of Turk and Dejan Knez of Laibach. The name was initially disliked by Rupel, who, fearing her parents reaction, proposed the name Rafael (Raphael).

The band had their debut performance in Belgrade's Students' Cultural Center, performing on joint concert with Otroci Socializma and Katarina II. Their first performance in a larger venue was in September 1983 on the Novi rock (New Rock) festival in Ljubljana's Križanke. The band soon gained a loyal fanbase with their synth-pop sound. At the end of 1983, they published their debut release, the 7-inch single with the songs "Moja mama" ("My Mom") and "Kako bih volio da si tu" ("How I Wish You Were Here"), the latter featuring Turk on vocals.
 
In March 1984, the band released their first album, Videosex '84, through ZKP RTLJ. The album brought the group's first hit, "Detektivska priča" ("Detective Story"), a synthpop track with lyrics about detectives searching for a female serial killer. Beside the mentioned song, the album featured the songs "Ana", "Neonska reklama" ("Neon Sign"), the songs previously released on the 7-inch single and several instrumental tracks. The album brought nationwide media attention to the band, with part of the press describing Anja Rupel as a sex symbol. After the album release, Matjaž Kosi left the group and formed the pop band Moulin Rouge. The band continued with one keyboardist only, appearing on the YU Rock Moment festival in Zagreb. In the autumn of 1984, they appeared on the MESAM festival and were the opening band on Parni Valjak tour.

In March 1985, Videosex released their second album, Lacrimae Christi (Latin for Christ's Tears). The title track was a version of a piece by German composer Carl Bohm. The album featured Bijelo Dugme keyboardist Laza Ristovski as guest. Lacrimae Christi introduced jazz elements in the band's sound. The songs "Sivi dan" ("Gloomy Day") and noir-inspired "Tko je zgazio gospođu mjesec" ("Who Ran Over Mrs. Moon") became nationwide hits. After the release of the album, Nina Sever left the band. During the year, Rupel took part in the YU Rock Misija project, a Yugoslav contribution to Live Aid, singing in the song "Za Milion Godina", and Videosex performed on the corresponding charity concert held at the Red Star Stadium in Belgrade.

After the suggestion of Lačni Franz leader Zoran Predin, the band recorded the mini-album Svet je zopet mlad (The World Is Young Again) with covers of evergreens of the Slovene 1960s pop scene. The recording featured drummer Dadi Krašnar (of Miladojka Youneed), keyboardist Andrija Pušić (formerly of Na Lepem Prijazni) and the RTV Ljubljana Dance Orchestra. The album was released in 1987, and brought the hits "Orion" (originally performed by Katja Levstik), "Vozi me vlak v daljave" ("The Train Takes Me Far Away", originally performed by Beti Jurković) and "Zemlja pleše" ("The Earth Is Dancing"). In 1987, Rupel starred in Franci Slak's films The Felons, and in 1988, she made a guest appearance on the Laibach album Let It Be, singing lead vocals in their version of "Across the Universe", also appearing in the song video directed by Boris Miljković and Branko Dimitrijević and aired on MTV.

In 1988, Nina Sever returned to the band, but Križaj stopped being a permanent member, continuing to work with the group in studio only. In 1990, Rupel cooperated with Laibach once again, appearing on the EP Sympathy for the Devil, singing lead vocals in one of Laibach's versions of "Sympathy for the Devil". In 1991, the band released their last studio album, Ljubi in sovraži (Love and Hate). The album recording featured numerous guest musicians: Dadi Krašnar, Andrija Pušić, drummer Ratko Divjak, bass guitarist Jani Hace, guitarist and percussionist Boris Romih, saxophonist Mario Marolt, and others. A year after the album release, the band ended their activity.

Post breakup
After Videosex disbanded, Rupel continued her career as a solo artist. She has recorded seven solo albums. Most of the songs on the albums were composed by her husband, Aleš Klinar, leader of the band Agropop, while the lyrics were written by Rupel. She hosted several music shows on Slovene television and radio stations. 

Both Turk and Križaj dedicated themselves to music production. Turk produced albums by Laibach and other alternative acts, while Križaj produced mostly albums by mainstream acts from Slovenia and Croatia. In 1998, Turk formed the house group Rotor, which featured Pissmakers bass guitarist Jani Hace and drummer Randzo and Miladojka Youneed saxophonist Mario Marolt, releasing two albums with them, Rotosphere (2000) and Phonophobia (2005).

Nina Sever worked as a piano teacher for a period of time, and later started working in the Dallas Records marketing department.

In 1997, the compilation album Arhiv (Archive) was released. The album featured songs from all four studio albums, in addition to eight previously unreleased tracks. The unreleased songs were recorded during ten years of the band's career, but had remained unreleased as the members had been dissatisfied with them. The compilation included the song "Ti si moja roža" ("You Are My Rose"), originally recorded by the group as their entry for the Jugovizija contest, but later dropped.

Legacy
In 1996, Serbian punk rock band Goblini covered the song "Kako bih volio da si tu", under the title "Anja, volim te" ("Anja, I Love You"), on their album U magnovenju (In the Flash). In 2003, Croatian pop band E.N.I. covered "Ti si moja roža" and Videosex version of "Orion" on their album Da Capo.

In 2006, "Detektivska priča" was polled No.57 on the B92 Top 100 Yugoslav songs list.

In 2015, Videosex '84 was polled No.58 on the list of 100 Greatest Yugoslav Albums published by the Croatian edition of Rolling Stone.

Members
 Matjaž Kosi - keyboards, synthesizers (1982–1984)
 Janez Križaj - bass guitar, programming (1982–1989)
 Anja Rupel - vocals, flute (1983–1992)
 Nina Sever - keyboards, synthesizers (1983–1985; 1988–1992)
 Iztok Turk - drums, programming (1982–1992)

Discography

Studio albums
 Videosex '84 (1984)
 Lacrimae Christi (1985)
 Svet je zopet mlad (1987)
 Ljubi in sovraži (1991)

Compilation albums
 Arhiv (1997)

Singles
 "Moja mama" / "Kako bih volio da si tu" (1983)

References

External links 
 Videosex at at Discogs

Slovenian rock music groups
Yugoslav rock music groups
Yugoslav synthpop groups
Musical groups established in 1982
Musical groups disestablished in 1992